Real Steel (foaled 1 March 2012) is a Japanese Thoroughbred racehorse and sire. After winning his only race as a juvenile in 2014 he developed into a top-class performer in the following year when he won the Tokino Minoru Kinen and finished second in the Spring Stakes, Satsuki Sho St Lite Kinen and Kikuka Sho as well as running fourth in the Japanese Derby. He reached his peak as a four-year-old in 2016 when he won the Dubai Turf and ran second in the Tenno Sho. He remained in training for two more years, winning the Mainichi Okan in 2017 and running third in the 2018 Dubai Turf.

Background
Real Steel is a bay horse standing 1.67 metres high, with a white star and four white socks bred in Hokkaido, Japan by Northern Farm. During his racing career he was owned by Sunday Racing and trained by Yoshito Yahagi.

He was from the fifth crop of foals sired by Deep Impact, who was the Japanese Horse of the Year in 2005 and 2006, winning races including the Tokyo Yushun, Tenno Sho, Arima Kinen and Japan Cup. Deep Impact's other progeny include Gentildonna, Harp Star, Kizuna, A Shin Hikari, Marialite and Saxon Warrior. Real Steel's dam Loves Only Me, a half-sister to Rumplestiltskin, was trained in Ireland but never raced and was exported to Japan after being sold for $900,000 at Keeneland in November 2009. She was a granddaughter of the outstanding racehorse and broodmare Miesque. She has also produced the Yushun Himba winner Loves Only You.

Racing career

2014: two-year-old season
Real Steel began his racing career on 27 December 2014 when he contested an event for previously unraced juveniles over 1800 metres at Hanshin Racecourse. Running on firm ground he won by more than three lengths from Liberator.

2015: three-year-old season
For his three-year-old debut Real Steel was stepped up in class to contest the Grade 3 Tokino Minoru Kinen (a trial race for the Satsuki Sho) over 1800 metres at Tokyo Racecourse on 15 February and started the 5.1/1 second favourite behind Sunday Racing's other runner Duramente. Ridden as in all of his race that year by Yuichi Fukunaga he won by half a length from Duramente with Ambitious in third place. Five weeks later at Nakayama Racecourse the colt started favourite for the Spring Stakes but in a slowly run race he was beaten a neck by Kitasan Black with third place going to Danon Platina. In the Satsuki Sho over 2000 metres at Nakayama on 19 April Real Steel briefly took the lead in the straight before being overtaken and finishing second to Duramente with Kitasan Black in third and the favoured Satono Crown coming home sixth. The colt was then stepped up in distance for the 82nd running of the Tokyo Yushun over 2400 metres at Tokyo on 31 May in which he started second favourite and came home fourth behind Duramente, Satono Rasen and Satono Crown.

After a break of almost four months, Real Steel returned on 27 September for the St Lite Kinen (a trial race for the Kikuka Sho) over 2400 metres at Hanshin. Starting the odds-on favourite he raced in mid-division before finishing strongly but was unable to catch Lia Fail and was beaten two lengths into second place. On 25 October the colt was made second favourite for the Kikuka Sho over 3000 metres at Kyoto Racecourse. After tracking the leading group he moved into contention entering the straight but despite producing an "impressive kick" in the last 200 metres he failed by a neck to overhaul Kitasan Black.

In the 2015 World's Best Racehorse Rankings Real Steel was given a rating of 116, making the 139th best racehorse in the world.

2016: four-year-old season

Real Steel began his third campaign on 28 February 2016 when he finished a close third behind Duramente and Ambitious in the Grade 2 Nakayama Kinen over 1800 metres with the unplaced runners including Logotype and Isla Bonita. The colt was then sent to the United Arab Emirates to contest the Dubai Turf on 26 March at Meydan Racecourse. Ridden by Ryan Moore he started at odds of 8/1 in an international field of fifteen runners. Godolphin's Jebel Hatta winner Tryster went off favourite, while the other contenders included Intilaaq (Rose of Lancaster Stakes), Very Special (Balanchine), Forries Waltz (Al Rashidiya), The Corsican (Arc Trial), Euro Charline (Beverly D. Stakes), Ertijaal (Cape Derby) and Flamboyant (San Marcos Stakes). Real Steel tracked the leaders on the outside as the 66/1 outsider Ghaamer set the early pace. Very Special went to the front 600 metres from the finish but Real Steel gained the advantage 200 metres out and kept on well to win by half a length from Euro Charline. Real Steel's trainer Yoshito Yahagi said after the race "I am elated and speechless. I am blessed with this horse and the people around me who have supported him". Ryan Moore commented "He's a beautiful horse, he's got lots of quality. It was a big effort from the horse, he had a tough trip and was out wide but has toughed it out. He never runs a bad race. He's a very brave horse and has had to do it the hard way".

On his return to Japan Real Steel was dropped back in distance for the Grade 1 Yasuda Kinen over 1600 metres in which he started second favourite but was outpaced in the straight and came home eleventh of the twelve runners, six lengths behind the winner Logotype. After a four and a half month summer break the colt returned for the autumn edition of the Tenno Sho over 2000 metres at Tokyo. Ridden by Mirco Demuro he came from the rear of the field with a late run on the outside to take second place, one and a half lengths behind the winner Maurice. On his final start of the year Real Steel was made the 3.2/1 second favourite for the Japan Cup over 2400 metres at Tokyo on 27 November. After tracking the leaders he kept on well in the straight without looking likely to win and came home fifth of the seventeen runners behind Kitasan Black, Sounds of Earth, Cheval Grand and Gold Actor.

In the 2016 World's Best Racehorse Rankings Real Steel was ranked the 34th best racehorse in the world with a rating of 120.

2017: five-year-old season

Real Steel began his 2017 season in the Nakayama Kinen, as in the previous year, but on this occasion he ran poorly and came home eighth of the eleven runners behind Neorealism. He was expected to defend the Dubai Turf on 25 March but was withdrawn from the race when he bled from his nostrils after a training gallop.

He was off the track for over seven months before making his comeback in the Mainichi Okan over 1800 metres at Tokyo on 8 October. Ridden by Mirco Demuro he was made the 4.8/1 third choice in the betting behind Soul Stirring and Makahiki in a twelve-runner field which also included Satono Aladdin (Yasuda Kinen) and One And Only (Tokyo Yushun). After racing in mid-division on the outside he made steady progress in the straight, took the lead 100 metres from the finish and held off the late challenge of Satono Aladdin to win by a neck. Three weeks later he contested the autumn running of the Tenno Sho for the second time and finished fourth behind Kitasan Black, Satono Crown and Rainbow Line.

Real Steel finished 129th 2017 World's Best Racehorse Rankings with a rating of 117.

2018: six-year-old season
On his first appearance of 2018, Real Steel was sent back to Dubai in an attempt to repeat his 2016 victory in the Dubai Turf and started at odds of 10/1 in a 15-runner field. Partnered by Mickael Barzalona he stayed on strongly in the closing stages to dead heat with Deirdre for third place behind Benbatl and Vivlos. Barzalona said "He turned in a good race, but he just didn't have enough." In his second attempt to win the Yasuda Kinen on 3 June, Real Steel failed to reproduce his best form and trailed home towards the rear of the sixteen-runner field. He was retired shortly after the race when he sustained a torn ligament in his right foreleg.

Real Steel's mark of 116 placed him 163rd in the 2018 World's Best Racehorse Rankings with a rating of 117.

Stud record
Real Steel was retired from racing to become a breeding stallion at the Shadai Stallion Station.

Pedigree

References

2012 racehorse births
Racehorses bred in Japan
Racehorses trained in Japan
Thoroughbred family 20